The Instax Mini 11 is an analog instant film camera designed, developed, marketed, and sold by Fujifilm. The Instax  camera is the successor to the Instax Mini 9 and was released in March 2020.

Specifications 
The Fujifilm Instax Mini 11 has a 60 mm ƒ/12.7 lens, similar to other Fujifilm Instax Mini cameras. The camera has a fully automatic exposure system and shutter speeds that vary automatically between ½ and 1/250 s. The lens is made of glass. It also has a selfie mode with a built-in selfie mirror. It operates with two high-power batteries.

Design 
The camera has curved edges and has a modern and compact look. It is smaller than the Mini 9 and lighter, and has different material around the lens and interchangeable shutter button stickers in different colors.

The Fujifilm Instax Mini 11 is available in five pastel colors: blush pink, charcoal gray, lilac purple, sky blue, and ice white. A version with design cues taken from K-pop group BTS's single "Butter" is available in a buttery yellow hue and with jewel graphics and heart motifs.

Instax Mini film
The film is available in white backgrounds as well as black, Blue Marble, Monochrome, Pink Lemonade, Macaron, Rainbow, and Confetti backgrounds.

See also
List of Instax cameras and printers
Fujifilm Instax Wide 300
Lomography Lomo'Instant Square Glass

Notes

References

Products introduced in 2020
Instant cameras
Fujifilm cameras